Ashtapadi is a 1983 Indian Malayalam film directed by Ambili and written by Perumbadavam Sreedharan based on his own novel of the same name. The film stars Menaka, Devan, Sukumari and Adoor Bhasi in the lead roles. The film has musical score by Vidyadharan.

Perumbadavam Sreedharan won the Kerala Film Critics Association Award for Best Story for the film. Babu Namboothiri won the Kerala Film Critics Association Award for Second Best Actor.

Cast
Menaka
Devan
Sukumari
Adoor Bhasi
Bharath Gopi
Babu Namboothiri
Ravi Menon

Soundtrack
The music was composed by Vidyadharan and the lyrics were written by P. Bhaskaran.

References

External links
 

1983 films
1980s Malayalam-language films